Mazrak Khan Zadran (Pashto: زمرک خان ځدراڼ;  1900s – 1972) was a Zadran chieftain who fought against the Afghan government during the Afghan tribal revolts of 1944–1947 in order to support the restoration of King Amanullah Khan. Some sources render his first name as Mazarak or Zemarak.

Personal life and appearance 
Mazrak was the eldest of the 9 or 18 sons of Babrak Khan, who was the Zadran chieftain at the time of Mazrak's birth. Among Mazrak's brothers was Saad Akbar Babrak. Mazrak's winter home was in the village of Almara. His appearance in 1951 was described as a "thickset man with a black beard" who "wore a brown embroidered woollen chugha (cloak) over his shalwar qamiz". In 1972, he was described as a "typical rugged Pathan, confident of his appearance and bearing, soft-spoken, with an air of self-acquired nobility. He was in light brown shalwar kameez, black high Liaquat cap, black shoes, dyed beard and moustache."

Chieftain 

Mazrak came to power following his father's death. He supported the restoration of Amanullah Khan, a king of Afghanistan who was deposed in the Afghan Civil War. A Pakistani enquiry in 1947 states that "after the present dynasty seized the throne of Kabul, Mazarak, the elder brother of Said Akbar, was given the rank of Naib Salar."

In April 1944, Mazrak led an ambush against government troops in the Southern province, after which he was beaten back and forced to retreat into the hills. He continued to fight the Afghan government for the following years. In late 1944, he invaded the British Raj, where he was joined by a Sultan Ahmed, a chieftain from Balochistan. They were later joined by another rebel leader nicknamed Pak.  

However, Mazrak's fortunes were not to last. He was forced out of British territory due to British bombardment. In October 1945, most Safi surrendered, followed by the surrender of Sultan Ahmad in November. Nonetheless, Mazrak and his brother Sher Muhd Khan continued to fight, refusing to surrender until 11 January 1947. Mazrak was expelled from Afghanistan by the government and was favourably received by the authorities in the British Raj.

Succession 
In Political conspiracies in Pakistan, written in 1969, it is stated that the Zadran chieftain at the time was Abdulla Khan Jadran Yawan, although it's unclear if succession was immediate or if someone else was chieftain between Mazrak and Abdulla.

Exile and later life 
By 2 April 1948, Mazrak and his brother Saad had been interned in Kahil, Abbottabad, in houses no. 3000 and 3259 respectively, under the provisions of Regulation III of 1818. On that day, Ghulam Sarwar, Deputy Commissioner, wrote to the Superintendent of Police letter No. 4938/30.20,  requesting him to keep a close watch on and occasionally report their activities. During the Indo-Pakistani War of 1947–1948, Mazrak (who was still imprisoned) allegedly encouraged his followers to join the Azad Kashmir Regular Force to "free Kashmir from Hindu rule".

On 16 October 1951, Mazrak's brother, Saad Akbar Babrak, shot and killed Liaquat Ali Khan, the prime minister of Pakistan. Shortly after, Mazrak was interned in the Police Reserve Inspector's vacant bungalow, and would remain interned there for "quite some time". He alleged that prior to his brother's assassination of Liaqat Ali Khan, he had been offered £1400 by "certain Afghan officials" to kill Liaqat, but that he had turned down the offer.

In 1972, Mazrak, who was still in Abbottabad, was interviewed by Zubair Qureshi on his brother's assassination of Liaqat Ali Khan. Mazrak insisted that his brother did not kill the Prime Minister and stated that he was still getting a stipend ($255 monthly) from the Pakistani government which was his only source of income and which was enough for his living and occasional trips to holiday resorts. His preferred summer escape was Shogran in the Kaghan Valley.

Family

References 

20th-century Afghan military personnel
Afghan rebels
Pashtun people
Afghan chiefs